Lukas Mertens (born 22 March 1996) is a German handball player for SC Magdeburg and the German national team.

He participated at the 2022 European Men's Handball Championship.

Honours 
Handball-Bundesliga:
: 2022
EHF European League:
: 2021
: 2022
: 2018
IHF Super Globe:
: 2021, 2022

References

External links
 Lukas Mertens at European Handball Federation
 Lukas Mertens at Handball-Bundesliga

1996 births
Living people
German male handball players
SC Magdeburg players
Handball-Bundesliga players